Lady M is a luxury confections brand established in 2001, most famous for its signature Mille Crêpes Cakes. It operates over 50 boutiques worldwide.

History
One of Lady M's founders, Emi Wada, invented the mille crêpes cake and sold them in her Paper Moon Cake Boutiques in Japan starting in 1985. The mille crêpe cakes she created consist of 20 thin handmade crêpes layered with light pastry cream and topped with a caramelized crust.

In 2001, Wada helped found Lady M as a wholesale business delivering cakes to hotels and restaurants in New York City.  By 2004, the Lady M cakes had become so popular that the company decided to open a store in Manhattan's Upper East Side. Wada later relinquished ownership in Lady M so she could concentrate on business back home in Japan.

Current Lady M CEO Ken Romaniszyn joined the business in 2008, and has overseen its introduction and growth of online shipping, its expansion into new markets, and its launch of new product lines.

Following success in Hong Kong and Taiwan, Lady M opened its first boutique in mainland China in Shanghai in 2017 to huge crowds. It has expanded rapidly in the country in subsequent years.

In 2021, Lady M opened its first champagne bar at its Singapore boutique in the ION Orchard mall.

Locations
As of 2022, Lady M operated boutiques in the following locations.

Asia

References

External links
Lady M: the New York bakery taking Asia by storm South China Morning Post

2001 establishments in the United States
Bakeries of the United States
Food and drink companies established in 2001
Privately held companies of the United States